Ernest Eugene Kell, Jr. (July 5, 1928 – April 29, 2017) served as mayor of Long Beach, California from 1984 to 1994, and as a city councilor for 13 years.

Life and career

Kell was born into modest circumstances on a farm in Washburn, North Dakota.  His family moved to Wilmington during the Great Depression, where he would graduate from Phineas Banning High School.  He received an associate degree from Long Beach City College, and attended California State University, Long Beach.

Kell was a United States Merchant Marine, and also United States Army veteran of the Korean War. He would later own a drafting and contracting company. In 1973, he married his wife Jackie, herself a Long Beach city councilor from 1998 to 2006. Kell died from cancer at his home in the El Dorado Park neighborhood of Long Beach. He was 88.

References

1928 births
2017 deaths
Mayors of Long Beach, California
California city council members
People from Burleigh County, North Dakota
Businesspeople from California
United States Army personnel of the Korean War
Deaths from cancer in California
United States Army soldiers
20th-century American businesspeople